Half Ticket is a 1962 Indian Hindi-language comedy  film directed by Kalidas and produced by Bombay Talkies. Starring Madhubala, Kishore Kumar and Pran, the film revolves around Vijay, a good-for-nothing young man who decides to leave his house when his father forces him to get married. 

Half Ticket is one of the last films to star Madhubala, as well as her final collaboration with her husband Kishore Kumar. It was a critical and commercial success and has become a cult film since its release. In 2020, The Indian Express listed the film in its "10 Bollywood comedies to watch in your lifetime".

Plot
Vijay (Kishore Kumar) is the good-for-nothing son of a rich industrialist, who becomes bored of his father's constant railing and the efforts to marry him off, with the intention of getting him "settled" in life. So Vijay walks out of his home and decides to leave for Bombay and start life afresh there, however he does not have enough money for a ticket.

Vijay gets a burst of inspiration from a plump child called Munna, who is waiting in line with his mother (Tun Tun), and decides to pass himself off a child in order to get the eponymous half-ticket.

Now disguised as Munna, Vijay is used as a mule for a diamond smuggler (Pran) without his knowledge. On the train, Vijay also meets Rajnidevi (Madhubala) and falls in love with her.

The rest of the film follows Vijay's exploits as he avoids capture by the diamond smuggler and his girlfriend (Shammi), romances Rajnidevi while avoiding her auntie-ji (Manorama), and reunites with his father.

Cast
 Madhubala as Rajnidevi / Asha
 Kishore Kumar as Vijaychand vald Lalchand vald Dhyanchand vald Hukumchand alias Munna / Vijay's Mother
 Pran as Notorious Thief Raja Babu aka Chacha
 Shammi as Lily Raja Babu's Mistress
 Manorama as Asha's Aunty
 Pradeep Kumar as Special Appearance
 Moni Chaterjee as Seth Lalchand Vijay's Father
 Tun Tun as the Real Munna's Mother
 Helen as Stage Dancer in the song Woh ek Nigah (Special Appearance)

Production

Soundtrack
Music composed by Salil Chowdhury and all songs are written by Shailendra.

Release 
Half Ticket was released on October 19th, 1962.

Critical reception 
Critic reviews were generally positive. Sukanya Verma wrote, "Fabulous soundtrack, frolicking premise and frothy dialogues led by the King of Comedy (Kumar) and Queen of vivacity (Madhubala), there is nothing half-hearted about this [film]."

Film Geek stated: "The movie makes a little more sense than that—only a little—but it matters not at all, as Kishore Kumar's limitless zany energy, Madhubala's irresistible charm, and several absolutely superb songs combine to make Half Ticket a delightful and hysterical ride."

Box office 
In India, the film had a box-office gross of ₹1 crore, with a nett of ₹0.5 crore, becoming the twelfth  highest-grossing film of 1962. The Best of the Year gave its inflation-adjusted nett as ₹251 crore. Box Office magazine calculated its inflation-adjusted gross by comparing the collection with the price of gold in 1962, which gave it an adjusted gross of ₹119  crore in 2011.

Legacy
Half Ticket is considered an important comedy film made in 1960s Bollywood.

References

External links
 

1962 films
1960s Hindi-language films
Indian romantic comedy films
Films scored by Salil Chowdhury
Indian remakes of American films
Cross-dressing in Indian films
1962 romantic comedy films